Miguel Tendillo Belenguer (born 1 February 1961) is a Spanish former footballer who played as a central defender.

Over 15 seasons, he amassed La Liga totals of 370 matches and 28 goals, appearing most notably for Valencia (eight years) and Real Madrid (five) and winning ten major titles.

Tendillo played nearly 30 times with Spain, representing the nation in one World Cup and one European Championship.

Club career
Born in Moncada, Valencia, Tendillo started his professional career with local Valencia CF, being first choice since the age of 18 (29 La Liga games in his first full season, which culminated with the UEFA Cup Winners' Cup conquest – he started in the final against Arsenal).

After nearly 300 official appearances with Valencia, Tendillo moved to Real Murcia upon the Ches 1986 relegation, and produced another solid season, which earned him the interest of league powerhouse Real Madrid as a replacement to longtime injuree Antonio Maceda. A starter in three of his five years, he helped the club to three leagues and as many domestic supercups.

Tendillo signed with lowly Real Burgos CF for 1992–93, not being able to help it prevent relegation from the top division and retiring at the end of the campaign, aged 32. Subsequently, he returned to the Mestalla Stadium as youth system coordinator.

International career
Tendillo earned his first cap for Spain on 21 May 1980, at not yet 20, appearing in a 2–2 friendly with Denmark in Copenhagen. Subsequently, he was called for that year's UEFA European Championship and the 1982 FIFA World Cup, appearing in a total of 27 matches and being deployed at right back in the former competition.

International goals

Personal life
Both Tendillo's father Miguel (born 1937) and son Alberto (1995) were footballers and defenders. The latter was also developed at Valencia.Tendillo, fuera del Valencia (Tendillo, out of Valencia); Super Deporte, 17 July 2017 (in Spanish)

HonoursValenciaCopa del Rey: 1978–79
UEFA Cup Winners' Cup: 1979–80
UEFA Super Cup: 1980Real Madrid'
La Liga: 1987–88, 1988–89, 1989–90
Copa del Rey: 1988–89
Supercopa de España: 1988, 1989, 1990

References

External links

CiberChe biography and stats 

1961 births
Living people
People from Horta Nord
Sportspeople from the Province of Valencia
Spanish footballers
Footballers from the Valencian Community
Association football defenders
La Liga players
Tercera División players
Valencia CF Mestalla footballers
Valencia CF players
Real Murcia players
Real Madrid CF players
Real Burgos CF footballers
Spain youth international footballers
Spain under-21 international footballers
Spain international footballers
UEFA Euro 1980 players
1982 FIFA World Cup players